Pradeep Gadge is an Indian Diabetologist known for managing complicated diabetic cases.

Education
Pradeep Gadge is a graduate of Maharashtra University of Health Sciences. He holds an MD in Medicine,  DPH, Diploma in Diabetology, and  F.R.S.H (London).

Medical career
Pradeep Gadge specializes in Diabetology and is known for treating diabetic patients and taking initiatives to educate people about diabetes care. He serves as a Clinical Investigator on several clinical endeavours. He also serves in the teaching faculty for postgraduate Diabetology students at the College of Physicians & Surgeons of Mumbai.

Pradeep has worked as a Visiting Diabetologist at Seven Hills Hospital, Mumbai and Breach Candy Hospital, Mumbai.

Pradeep has worked as a Clinical Associate-ICU at S L Raheja Hospital Mumbai & All India Institute of Diabetes Mahim, Mumbai . He has also served  at Lilavati Hospital & Research Centre in the Department of Endocrinology / Diabetology. Gadge writes articles on diabetes  which are regularly published in various textbooks. He is a certified speaker for the American Diabetes Association (ADA).

Pradeep is regularly quoted in various medical write-ups published by reputed newspapers such as The Times of India, DNA, Hindustan Times, Business Standard, Mumbai Mirror, The Economic Times,

See also
 Diabetes mellitus
 Diabetes mellitus type 1
 Diabetes mellitus type 2

References

Indian diabetologists
Living people
Year of birth missing (living people)